The 2002 Minnesota Attorney General election was held on Tuesday, November 5, 2002 to elect the Minnesota Attorney General for a four-year term. Incumbent DFL Attorney General Mike Hatch ran for reelection and won. The election marked the ninth attorney general race in a row won by the DFL since 1970.

Democratic–Farmer–Labor primary 
Incumbent attorney general Mike Hatch won the DFL nomination unopposed at the party's May 3 convention in Minneapolis. There was some speculation that Hatch would not seek the endorsement for governor and launch his third run for governor, but it did not come to pass.

The primary was held on September 10. Incumbent attorney general Mike Hatch won the primary unopposed.

Candidates

Nominated in primary 

 Mike Hatch, incumbent Minnesota Attorney General

Declined 

 Matt Entenza, state representative from St. Paul

Results

Republican primary 
Lawyer Thomas Kelly of Medina was endorsed uncontested at the state Republican convention in St. Paul on June 15.

The primary was held on September 10. Kelly defeated perennial candidate and 1994 Republican nominee for attorney general Sharon Anderson.

Candidates

Nominated in primary 

 Thomas Kelly, lawyer at Dorsey & Whitney

Eliminated in primary 

 Sharon Anderson, activist, perennial candidate

Results

Independence primary 
Lawyer Dale Nathan was the only candidate to seek the Independence Party endorsement for attorney general at the party's July 13 convention in St. Cloud. He did not receive the endorsement after word spread of a pending disciplinary action against him by the Minnesota Lawyers Professional Responsibility Board

The primary was held on September 10. Nathan defeated challenger Richard Bullock.

Reform Party

Nominated in primary 

 Dale Nathan, lawyer

Eliminated in primary 

 Richard Bullock

Results

General election

Results

References 

Minnesota Attorney General elections